Melica bonariensis is a species of grass endemic to Argentina where it can be found in such provinces as Buenos Aires (Bahía Blanca), La Pampa, and Rio Negro.

Description
The species is perennial with short rhizomes. Culm-internodes scaberulous with leaf-sheaths are tubular with one of their length being closed. They are also erect and connate. They also have scabrous bottom, are pubescent and hairy. The main panicle branches are smooth and appressed. Fertile spikelets have hairy, pubescent, curved and filiformed pedicels. Florets are diminished with callus being pubescent as well. The species are bisexual and have a scabrous rachilla.

Margins of lemma are ciliate. Both the lower and upper glumes are keelless but have different apexes. The upper glume apex is erose and obtuse while the lower glumes is acute.

Ecology
Melica bonariensis can be found in the grassy steppes of the southern part of La Pampa, east of Rio Negro and southwest of the Buenos Aires. It blooms from the end of August to mid September.

References

bonariensis
Endemic flora of Argentina